National Public School, Koramangala is a private school located in Koramangala. It was established in 2003 and is a part of the NPS group of schools. 
 
The school is run by the National Education Trust, which is a linguistic, regional, minority institution.

School structure 
Students are admitted to one of four houses:
 Challengers  scarlet "To strive, to seek, to find and not to yield".
 Explorers purple "Endeavour to Reach Beyond"
 Pioneers amber "The Light that always shows, the Spark that always glows".
 Voyagers blue "Vigour, Valour, Victory".

Each year, the faculty members nominate a student body to govern individual clubs and associations. Students of Grades XII or XI are eligible for the posts of School Prefect, Sports Captain  and House Captain, and their deputies. One student is handed charge of the student body. The students of Grades IX to XII are elected by teachers to preside over clubs. These clubs include Science, Mathematics, Computers, Literary, Commerce, Performing Arts, Fine Arts, Music, Quizzing and the News Desk. The student government body comprises close to 60 members and takes office at an official Investiture Ceremony.

Events

Ahan 
It is a 2 day cultural event, held once in every 3 years, since 2006. All the students come together to showcase performances like dances, songs and skits for their parents. These performances are all based on a theme which during the last edition was about ballyotsav, a celebration of childhood. This is an event held on a grand scale which sees involvement from all the students of the school as well as teachers who work behind the scenes.

Khoj 
Khoj is a science festival held over the course of 2 days. It takes place once every 3 years, the first of which was in 2005. The students make various projects in physics, chemistry, biology and computer science that showcase their scientific temper. Seniors are also to host informative and semi-interactive plays. Parents and students from other school are invited to attend the festival.

Sports Day 
Sports day is a triennial event. The four houses compete over the course of the year in various sports events, and on the final day, the finals of the track and field events are held in TISB. Points are awarded for each victory. At the end of the day, the house with the most points is awarded the sports cup

NPSK Hack 
It is an annual hackathon held in the auditorium of the school. The first edition was in 2016. It was the first hackathon in Bengaluru where the participants were school students.
Teams from other schools are invited to program for 8 hours. At the end of the day, the students with the best projects win prizes.

Zenith 
It is a biannual single day fest that includes cultural and technical events. Various schools are invited to participate in the multitude of events including, but not limited to  singing, dancing, programming, engineering and quizzes.

Iris 
It is a science and literary competition that was first conducted in 2018. Events span from treasure hunts and escape rooms to moot court and poetry events.

Founder's Cup 
This is a basketball tournament, held annually since 2016. The tournament allows students from grade 10 to grade 12 to participate. Initially it was only for the NPS group of schools, it was later changed to include other schools. The Tournament takes place over the course of 3 days, with a boys category and a girls category. Referees from the Karnataka Basketball Assication preside over the game.

Extracurricular activities 
Students participate in various activities such as quizzing, MUNs, spelling bees, dancing (classical and western) and singing. The school has 2 basketball courts, one cemented. It also features a volleyball / throw ball court and an empty ground. The students have 2 physical education periods a week, each lasting 35 minutes. They are encouraged to play any of the aforementioned sports. Students also attend various sports tournaments representing the school.

Initiatives

TAGE 
Towards A Green Education is a programme started by Aniruddha Voruganti and Nishant Panicker in 2016 that aims to provide stationery and books to the underprivileged. It hosts various drives to collect excess books and stationery from the students. It also hosts paper collection drives and notebook making competitions. The notebooks are made from unused pages of older partially used notebooks. These notebooks are then sent to the underprivileged students.

Why Waste? 
This initiative, created by Garvita Gulhati and Pooja Tanwade, aims to curb food and water waste in restaurants by increasing awareness and introducing a few basic common sense measures. Nearly 130 restaurants in Bengaluru were contacted. As of 2016, over 30 restaurants were cooperating to reduce water wastage in Bengaluru.

References 

High schools and secondary schools in Bangalore